The Grand Valley Brewing Company was founded in 1937 in Ionia, Michigan. It created the first malt liquor brewed in the United States. 

Brewery owner 'Click' Koerber is the creator of the process and owner of the patent that details the production of Clix malt liquor. 

In addition to Clix Malt Liquor, the Grand Valley Brewing Company created a Stout beer using the same process.

References

External links
Link to US Patent
A thorough history of Malt Liquor

Beer brewing companies based in Michigan